Woodhill is the name of several places in New Zealand:
Woodhill, Auckland is a locality near Helensville in the Rodney District
Woodhill, Whangarei is a suburb of Whangarei
Woodhill Forest is a forest located northwest of Auckland